Bart Stalmans (born 5 December 1962 in Neerpelt) is a Belgian sprint canoer who competed in the early 1990s. At the 1992 Summer Olympics in Barcelona, he was eliminated in the semifinals of the K-2 1000 m and the repechages of the K-2 500 m event.

References
 Sports-Reference.com profile

1962 births
Belgian male canoeists
Canoeists at the 1992 Summer Olympics
Living people
Olympic canoeists of Belgium
People from Neerpelt
Sportspeople from Limburg (Belgium)